The FC de Onda al Grao de Castellon y Villareal-Puerto de Burriana was a Spanish  gauge narrow gauge railway that operated over 43 kilometres of track between 1888 and 1963, when the system closed. Opening dates of the various sections are as follows:

Main line 29 km
Grao de Castellon - Casellon de la Plana 1888-1963.
Casellon de la plana - Vilarreal 1889-1963.
Villarreal - Onda 1890-1963.
Branch line 14 km.
Vilarreal - Burriana 1907-1956, reopened 1960-1963.
Burriana - Grao de Burriana 1907-1936.
Burriana - Porto de Burriana 1948-1956.

At closure the railway had 12 steam locomotives of 0-6-0T and 0-6-2T types, 35 passenger cars and 172 freight cars.

References 

750 mm gauge railways in Spain